Thomas Wilson CBE FRSE (10 October 1927 – 12 June 2001) was an American-born Scottish composer of classical music.

Early life and education

Thomas Brendan Wilson was born in Trinidad, Colorado to British parents and moved to Britain with his family when he was 17 months old.

The family settled in the Glasgow, Scotland area where he lived and worked for the remainder of his life. Wilson was educated in Glasgow before taking an undergraduate course at St. Mary's College, Aberdeen. He then studied Music at the University of Glasgow, where he continued as a postgraduate, receiving a doctorate (DMus).

He served in the Royal Air Force from 1945 to 1948.

Career
One of the first honours graduates in music from Glasgow University, Wilson became a lecturer at his alma mater in 1957. He was later appointed a Reader (1971) and given a Personal Chair in 1977. He consistently played an active part in the musical life of the UK, holding executive and advisory positions in such organisations as the Scottish Arts Council, The New Music Group of Scotland, The Society for the Promotion of New Music, The Composers' Guild of Great Britain (chairman 1986–89) now the British Association of Composers and Songwriters, and The Scottish Society of Composers (of which he was a founder member).

His works have been played all over the world and embrace all forms - orchestral, choral-orchestral, chamber-orchestral, opera, ballet, brass band, vocal music of different kinds, and works for a wide variety of chamber ensembles and solo instruments. Wilson completed five symphonies, the fourth of which, Passeleth Tapestry, was premiered by the Royal Scottish National Orchestra under Bryden Thomson on 6 August 1988 in Paisley Abbey. He also completed several concertos and choral works. His largest work was an opera, Confessions of a Justified Sinner (1972–75), commissioned by Scottish Opera and based on the novel by James Hogg.

Wilson was awarded the CBE in 1990. The following year he was awarded an honorary DMus Degree from Glasgow University and created a Fellow of the Royal Scottish Academy of Music and Drama. He was also elected a Fellow of the Royal Society of Edinburgh.

The 80th anniversary of Wilson's birth on 10 October 1927 was marked by a performance of the composer's St Kentigern Suite on 17 January 2008 by the RSAMD Chamber Orchestra, and by a performance of the composer's Violin Concerto also in January 2008 by the National Youth Orchestra of Scotland.

A biography co-written by David Griffith and Margaret Wilson and edited by Prof. Karl Gwiasda has been completed and published in 2011 to celebrate the 10th Anniversary of his death.

Death 
Wilson died on 12 June 2001.

Works

Orchestral works

 Symphony No. 1 (1955) (withdrawn)
 Toccata for orchestra (1959)
 Variations for orchestra (1960)
 Pas De Quoi (1964) Six little dances for strings.
 Symphony No. 2 (1965)
 Concerto for orchestra (1967)
 Touchstone (1967) Commissioned by the BBC for the Sir Henry Wood Promenade Concerts.
 Threnody (1970) music was taken from Wilson's opera "The Charcoal Burner".
 Ritornelli Per Archi (1972) Commissioned for the Edinburgh Festival by the Scottish Baroque Ensemble.
 Symphony No. 3 (1979) Commissioned by Musica Nova.
 Mosaics (1981) Commissioned for Cantilena by Radio Clyde.
 Introit (1982) Commissioned by BBC.
 Piano Concerto (1985) Commissioned by Bryden Thomson for David Wilde and the BBC Philharmonic Orchestra.
 St Kentigern Suite (1986) Commissioned by The Friends of Glasgow Cathedral.
 Viola Concerto (1987) Commissioned by James Durrant with assistance from the BBCSSO Trust.
 Symphony No. 4, Passeleth Tapestry (1988; numbered as a symphony 1996) Commissioned by Renfrew District Council together with Strathclyde Regional Council to mark Paisley's 500th anniversary as a Burgh of Barony.
 Carillon (1990) Commissioned by Glasgow city council in 1990 as part of its European City of Culture celebrations, as the inaugural work to celebrate the opening of the city's new Royal Concert Hall.
 Violin Concerto (1993) Commissioned by the National Youth Orchestra of Scotland and BP for Ernst Kovacic.
 Guitar Concerto (1996) Commissioned by Phillip Thorne.
 Symphony No. 5 (1998) Commissioned by the Scottish Chamber Orchestra.

Choral works

 Ave Maria/Pater Noster (1967)
 Night Songs (1967) Commissioned by the John Currie Singers
 Missa Pro Mundo Conturbato (1970) Commissioned by the John Currie Singers.
 Te Deum (1971) Large Chorus. Commissioned by the Edinburgh Festival for the opening concert on the occasion of its 25th Anniversary.
 Sequentiae Passions (1971) Large Chamber Choir. Commissioned by Musica Nova.
 Ubi Caritas et Amor (1976) Commissioned by the Baccholian Singers for the City of London Festival.
 Songs of Hope and Expectation (1977) Chamber Choir Commissioned by the John Currie Singers.
 Amor Christi (1989) Chamber Choir. Commissioned the Scottish Philharmonic Singers.
 Cantigas Para Semana Santa (1992) Commissioned by Cappella Nova
 Confitemini Domino (1993) Commissioned by the Royal College of Organists to celebrate their 100th Anniversary

A cappella masses
 St. Augustine (1955)
 Mass in Polyphonic Style (1960)
 Missa Brevis (1960)
 Mass based on a Bach Chorale(1961)

Operas

The Charcoal Burner, opera in one act with eight characters, to a libretto by Edwin Morgan (1968), commissioned by the BBC
The Confessions of a Justified Sinner (1975), opera in three acts with three main characters plus chorus to a libretto by John Currie (based on the novel The Private Memoirs and Confessions of a Justified Sinner by James Hogg), commissioned by Scottish Opera

Ballet

Embers of Glencoe (1973), commissioned by Scottish Ballet

Brass band

Sinfonietta (1967) Commissioned by the Scottish Amateur Music Association for the National Youth Brass Band of Scotland.
Cartoon for Cornet (1969) Commissioned by Robert Oughton and the Scottish CWS Band.
Refrains and Cadenzas (1984) Commissioned by the Cheltenham Festival and used as the test piece for the European Championships in 1984.

Vocal

By The Waters of Babylon (1951), a capella setting of Psalm 137
Three Orkney Songs for soprano/baritone and quintet (1961), commissioned by the BBC.
Six Scots Songs for voice and piano (1962), commissioned by the Baccholian Singers for the City of London Festival
Carmina Sacra (1964), orchestral or voice and keyboard.
My Soul Longs for Thee, SSA and organ (1967)
Night Songs (1967), a capella, commissioned by the John Currie Singers
One Foot in Eden, orchestral or voice and piano (1977), commissioned by Josephine Nendick
The Willow Branches – Seven Songs from the Chinese, orchestral or voice and piano (1983), commissioned by Marilyn de Blieck

Carols

A Babe is Born (1967)
There Is No Rose (1974)

Chamber works

 String Quartet No. 2 (1954)
 String Quartet No. 3 (1958), McEwen Composition Prize
 Violin Sonata (1961), commissioned by the University of Glasgow
 Sonatina for clarinet and piano (1962) 
 Concerto Da Camera (1965), commissioned by Bernicia Ensemble
 Pas De Quoi, Six little dances for strings (1965) 
 Piano Trio (1966), commissioned by the Scottish Trio
 Sinfonia for Seven Instruments (1968), commissioned by the University of Glasgow
 Cello Sonata (1971), commissioned by Glasgow Chamber Music Society
 Canti Notturni (1972), commissioned by the Clarina Ensemble
 Ritornelli Per Archi (1972), commissioned by the Scottish Baroque Ensemble for the Edinburgh Festival
 Complementi (1973), commissioned by Clarina Ensemble
 String Quartet No. 4 (1978), commissioned by the Edinburgh String Quartet
 Mosaics (1981), commissioned for Cantilena by Radio Clyde
 Chamber Concerto (1985), commissioned by the New Music Group of Scotland
 St Kentigern Suite (1986), commissioned by the Friends of Glasgow Cathedral, on the occasion of the cathedral's 850th anniversary
 Chamber Symphony (1990), commissioned by Paragon Ensemble and Glasgow District Council as part of the celebrations during Glasgow's reign as European City of Culture 1990
 Threads (1996), commissioned by Duo Contemporain
 Sunset Song (2011), arranged by Kenny Letham from incidental music originally commissioned by the BBC

Instrumental

 Sonatina for piano (1956)
 Piano Sonata (1964)
 Three Pieces - Reverie, Tzigane, Valse Viennoise (1964) For Piano.  Later arranged for two guitars.
 Fantasia for cello (1964)
 Soliloquy (1969) For Guitar. Commissioned by Glasgow Master Concerts for Julian Bream.
 Three Pieces for guitar (1971)
 Coplas Del Ruisenor for guitar (1972), commissioned by Angelo Gilardino.
 Cancion for guitar (1982)
 Incunabula for piano (1983)
 Dream Music for guitar (1983), commissioned by Phillip Thorne.
 Toccata Festevole for organ (1991), commissioned by the Paisley International Organ Festival
 Chanson De Geste for solo horn (1991), commissioned by Redcliffe Concerts

Other

The Face of Love (1954) Commissioned by BBC Radio
Witchwood (1954) Commissioned by BBC Radio
Glencoe (1955) Commissioned by BBC Radio
Susannah and the Elders (1955) Commissioned by BBC Radio
Storm (1956) Commissioned by BBC Radio
Oggs Log (1956) Commissioned by BBC Radio
All in Good Faith (1957) Commissioned by BBC Radio
A Nest of Singing Birds (1957) Commissioned by BBC Radio
The Boy David (1957) Commissioned by BBC Radio
For Tae Be King (1957) Commissioned by BBC Radio
The Great Montrose (1958) Commissioned by BBC Radio
The Wallace (1959) Commissioned by BBC Radio
Enquiry (1960) Commissioned by BBC Radio
Brush Off the Dust (1964) Commissioned by BBC Radio
Checkpoint (1965) Commissioned by BBC Radio
Charles Rennie Mackintosh (1965) Commissioned by BBCTV
Robert Burns (1965) Commissioned by BBCTV
A Season for Mirth (1966) Commissioned by BBC Radio
A Spell for Green Corn (1967) Commissioned by BBC Radio
Ships of the '45 (1968) Commissioned by BBC Radio
The March of the '45 (1969) Commissioned by BBC Radio
Sunset Song (Part 1 of A Scots Quair) (1971) Commissioned by BBCTV
The New Road (1973) Commissioned by BBCTV
There was a Man (1980) Commissioned by Radio Clyde
Summer Solstice (1980) Commissioned by Radio Clyde
The House with the Green Shutters (1980) Commissioned by BBC Radio
Cloud Howe (Part 2 of A Scots Quair) (1982) Commissioned by BBCTV
Grey Granite (Part 3 of A Scots Quair) (1983) Commissioned by BBCTV
Voyage of St Brandon (1984) Commissioned by BBCTV
Murder Not Proven (1984) Commissioned by BBCTV
Gaudi (N.D.) Commissioned by BBCTV
The Castle of May (N.D.) Commissioned by BBCTV

Recordings

Cancion for Guitar (2003) Tuomo Tirronen; MSR Classics MS1214
Cancion for Guitar (2008) Stefan Grasse; Xolo CD1015
Cancion for Guitar (2009) Allan Neave; Delphian DCD34079
Carillon (1990) Royal Scottish National Orchestra (cond. Rory Macdonald); Linn Records CKD 616
Cartoon (1995) West Lothian Schools Brass Band; Polyphonic Reproductions Ltd. QPRL075D
Cartoon (1998) Royal Norwegian Navy Band; Doyen Series DOYCD083
Cartoon (2000) West Lothian Celebrity Winds; 'Celebrations'
Cello Sonata (1993) Alla Vasilieva & Alexei Smitov; Russian Disc RDCD00680
Chamber Symphony (1993) Paragon Ensemble; Continuum Ltd. CCD1032
Complementi (2011) Daniel's Beard; Meridian CDE84607
Confitemini Domino (2005) Bearsden Choir; Norsound NM-050344
Coplas del Ruiseñor for Guitar (2008) Stefan Grasse; Xolo CD1015
Fantasia for 'Cello (1993) Alla Vasilieva; Russian Disc RDCD00680
Incunabula for Piano (2001) Johannes Wolff; Hastedt Verlag & Musikedition HT5322
Incunabula for Piano (2009) Simon Smith; Delphian DCD34079
Introit (1988) Scottish National Orchestra; Queensgate Music
Piano Concerto (1988) Scottish National Orchestra; Queensgate Music
Piano Sonata (1991) Peter Sievewright; Merlin Records MRFD891706
Piano Sonata (2001) Johannes Wolff; Hastedt Verlag & Musikedition HT5322
Piano Sonata (2009) Simon Smith; Delphian DCD34079
Piano Sonatina (2001) Johannes Wolff; Hastedt Verlag & Musikedition HT5322
Piano Trio (2009) Delphian DCD34079
Refrains and Cadenzas (1997) Grimethorp Colliery Band; Chandos Brass CHAN4549
St Kentigern Suite (1990) Scottish Ensemble; Virgin Classics Ltd. VC7 91112-2 260421-231
St Kentigern Suite (1996) RSAMD Chamber Orchestra; RSAMD
String Quartet No. 3 (2009) Edinburgh Quartet; Delphian DCD34079
Sinfonietta for Brass Band (1997) National Youth Brass Band of Scotland; Amadeus AMSCD027
Symphony No. 2 (2019) Royal Scottish National Orchestra (cond. Rory Macdonald); Linn Records CKD 643
Symphony No. 3 (2018) Royal Scottish National Orchestra (cond. Rory Macdonald); Linn Records CKD 616
Symphony No. 4, Passeleth Tapestry (2018) Royal Scottish National Orchestra (cond. Rory Macdonald); Linn Records CKD 616
Symphony No. 5 (2019) Royal Scottish National Orchestra (cond. Rory Macdonald); Linn Records CKD 643
There is no Rose (1998) Cappella Nova; Rota RTCD001
Three Pieces for Guitar (1997) Allan Neave; BGS Records BGCD104
Three Pieces for Guitar (2009) Allan Neave; Delphian DCD34079
Three Pieces for Piano (2001) Johannes Wolff; Hastedt Verlag & Musikedition HT5322
Violin Concerto (1993) National Youth Orchestra of Scotland; NYOS Records NYOS001

References

Further reading
 Rayment, Malcolm, "The Music of Thomas Wilson", in Lindsay, Maurice (ed.), The Scottish Review: Arts and Environment 33, February 1984, pp. 30 – 35,

External links
Guardian obituary by John Maxwell Geddes
The Thomas Wilson Website

1927 births
2001 deaths
20th-century classical composers
20th-century British composers
20th-century British male musicians
20th-century Scottish musicians
American emigrants to the United Kingdom
British male classical composers
Scottish classical composers
Scottish opera composers
Brass band composers
Male opera composers
Academics of the University of Glasgow
Alumni of the University of Glasgow
Commanders of the Order of the British Empire
Fellows of the Royal Society of Edinburgh
People from Trinidad, Colorado